Laguna Verde (Spanish for "green lake" or "green lagoon") is a salt lake in the Andes Mountains of Chile. It lies in the Atacama Region (third region), near San Francisco Pass. The stratovolcano Ojos del Salado, on the border with Argentina, marks the south border of its basin.

High mountains surround the lake. Among them are El Muerto, Incahuasi, Falso Azufre,  Peña Blanca, Barrancas Blancas, El Ermitaño, Vicuñas  and the already mentioned Ojos del Salado, the highest active volcano in the world.

See also
Nevado Tres Cruces National Park
Copiapó
Atacama Desert

References

External links
 

Lakes of Atacama Region
Lakes of Chile